Gomphocarpus purpurascens, is a species of plant endemic to Ethiopia, where it is used medicinally to treat fever.

References

External links
 African Plant Database entry

purpurascens
Flora of Ethiopia
Plants described in 1840